Raymond Orville Coulter (April 12, 1897 – January 23, 1965) was an American sport shooter who competed in the 1924 Summer Olympics.

He was born Hadley, Illinois.

In 1924 he won the gold medal as member of the American team in the team free rifle event and the bronze medal in the team running deer, single shots competition. In the 1924 Summer Olympics he also participated in the following events:

 Team running deer, double shots - fifth place
 running deer, double shots - ninth place
 running deer, single shots - 17th place

References

1897 births
1965 deaths
American male sport shooters
United States Distinguished Marksman
ISSF rifle shooters
Running target shooters
Shooters at the 1924 Summer Olympics
Olympic gold medalists for the United States in shooting
Olympic bronze medalists for the United States in shooting
Medalists at the 1924 Summer Olympics
People from Pike County, Illinois
19th-century American people
20th-century American people